Eupithecia vana is a moth in the family Geometridae.  It is found in China, where it is known from the Shaanxi and Henan provinces. The species is on wing from mid-April to mid-May, and again from early to late August.

References

Moths described in 1979
vana
Moths of Asia